Fields of Science and Technology (FOS) is a compulsory classification for statistics of branches of scholarly and technical fields, published by the OECD in 2002. It was created out of the need to interchange data of research facilities, research results etc. It was revised in 2007 under the name Revised Fields of Science and Technology.

List 

 Natural sciences
 Mathematics
 Computer and information sciences
 Physical sciences
 Chemical sciences
 Earth and related environmental sciences
 Biological sciences
 Other natural sciences
 Engineering and technology
 Civil engineering
 Electrical engineering, electronic engineering, information engineering
 Mechanical engineering
 Chemical engineering
 Materials engineering
 Medical engineering
 Environmental engineering
 Systems engineering
 Environmental biotechnology
 Industrial biotechnology
 Nano technology
 Other engineering and technologies
 Medical and health sciences
 Basic medicine
 Clinical medicine
 Health sciences
 Health biotechnology
 Other medical sciences
 Agricultural sciences
 Agriculture, forestry, and fisheries
 Animal and dairy science
 Veterinary science
 Agricultural biotechnology
 Other agricultural sciences
Social science
 Psychology
 Economics and business
 Educational sciences
 Sociology
 Law
 Political science
 Social and economic geography
 Media and communications
 Other social sciences
 Humanities
 History and archaeology
 Languages and literature
 Philosophy, ethics and religion
 Arts (arts, history of arts, performing arts, music)
 Other humanities

See also 
 International Standard Classification of Education
 International Standard Classification of Occupations
 Wissenschaft – epistemological concept in which serious scholarly works of history, literature, art, and religion are similar to natural sciences

References 

OECD
Scientific classification